Rodopoli (old name: Σταθμός Ποροΐων) is a village in the Serres region of Greece. It is situated in the municipal unit of Kerkini, in the Sintiki municipality, within the Serres region of Central Macedonia. 

Rodopoli was recognized as a Community on 2 August 1926, by a relevant Decree published in the Government Gazette (Greece), which separated the settlement from the then existing settlement of the Poroy Railway Station. The station opened in 1900. known before 1927 as Poroia the settlement had been annexed by Greece on 18 October 1912 during the First Balkan War.

Population evolution 
Official census data for the settlement of Rodopolis, Serres can be found from the census of 1951 onwards.
The Special Census Table of the Community of Rodopolis is the following:

 source: National Statistical Service of Greece

References

Populated places in Serres (regional unit)